Park Hee-moon (born 4 January 2001) is a South Korean sport shooter. She represented South Korea at the 2020 Summer Olympics in Tokyo 2021, competing in women's 10 metre air rifle.

References

 

2001 births
Living people
South Korean female sport shooters
Shooters at the 2020 Summer Olympics
Olympic shooters of South Korea
21st-century South Korean women